The 2015–16 Eredivisie Vrouwen was the sixth season of the Netherlands women's professional football league, and the first season since 2011–12. The Eredivisie returned after a three-season period, when it was replaced by the BeNe League, which involved teams from the Netherlands and Belgium. The season took place from 21 August 2015 to 20 May 2016 with seven teams. FC Twente won its second Eredivisie title and became Dutch champions for a fourth consecutive year (including the BeNe League period).

Teams

Since the Eredivisie last edition (in 2011–12), VVV-Venlo and FC Utrecht no longer had women's teams, while Ajax and PSV, both established women's teams in 2012, made their debut in the league alongside ADO Den Haag, SC Heerenveen, Telstar, FC Twente and PEC Zwolle which all returned to the Eredivisie.

Source: Soccerway

Format
The seven teams play each other four times (twice home and twice away). The champion qualifies to the UEFA Women's Champions League. There is no relegation system in place.

Standings

Results

Season's first half

Season's second half

Top scorers

References

External links
 
 Season on soccerway.com

Ned
1
2015-16